Harry Pavel (born  in Fuchsstadt) is a German wheelchair curler.

He participated in the 2018 Winter Paralympics where German wheelchair curling team finished on eighth place.

In 2015 and 2016 he competed in Swiss Wheelchair Curling Championship, won gold medal both times.

Teams

References

External links 
 
 
 
  (video)

1951 births
Living people
German male curlers
German wheelchair curlers
German disabled sportspeople
Paralympic wheelchair curlers of Germany
Wheelchair curlers at the 2018 Winter Paralympics
Swiss wheelchair curling champions
People from Bad Kissingen (district)
Sportspeople from Lower Franconia